Romeo Romanutti (6 August 1926 – 31 December 2007) was an Italian basketball player. He competed in the men's tournament at the 1948 Summer Olympics.

References

1926 births
2007 deaths
Italian men's basketball players
Olympic basketball players of Italy
Basketball players at the 1948 Summer Olympics
Basketball players from Split, Croatia